Conner David Henry (born July 21, 1963) is an American professional basketball coach and former player. He played collegiately for the UC Santa Barbara Gauchos and was selected as the 89th overall pick in the 1986 NBA draft by the Houston Rockets. Henry had short stints with four National Basketball Association (NBA) teams in two seasons before he embarked on a career in the American minor leagues and overseas.

Henry began his coaching career as an assistant at Claremont McKenna College before traveling to Australia to join the coaching staff of the Perth Wildcats of the NBL, where he became the head coach for one season in 2008–09. Henry returned to the United States to join the Los Angeles D-Fenders of the NBA D-League as an assistant coach. Following two seasons with the D-Fenders, he was appointed as head coach of the Fort Wayne Mad Ants in 2013 and named the NBA D-League Coach of the Year after his first season. Henry served as an assistant coach for the Orlando Magic of the NBA in the 2015–16 season. He returned to Australia in 2020 when he was appointed head coach of the Adelaide 36ers.

Playing career
He was a 6'7" (203 cm), 195 lb (89 kg) shooting guard and from 1982 to 1986 played college basketball for the University of California, Santa Barbara, where he scored 1,236 points.

He was selected by the Houston Rockets with the 19th pick of the fourth round in the 1986 NBA Draft. Throughout his short NBA career from 1986–88 he played with the Rockets, Boston Celtics, Milwaukee Bucks and Sacramento Kings. Henry also played for the Rapid City Thrillers and the Yakima Sun Kings of the CBA. In 1990, he was voted as the CBA Player of the Year as well as the CBA All-Star Game MVP. Then in 1992 he played in the first CBA All-Star Game held in the Pacific Northwest, of which he was named Most Valuable Player once again after hitting four-of-seven three-pointers, the most made in such an event since 1970. After his NBA career he spent 10 years playing professionally in Italy, Spain, France and Greece before returning to Montana, US.

NBA career statistics

Regular season

|-
| align="left" | 1986–87
| align="left" | Houston
| 18 || 0 || 5.1 || .242 || .091 || .700 || 0.4 || 0.4 || 0.2 || 0.0 || 1.3
|-
| align="left" | 1986–87
| align="left" | Boston
| 36 || 0 || 6.4 || .369 || .387 || .588 || 0.8 || 0.8 || 0.2 || 0.0 || 2.7
|-
| align="left" | 1987–88
| align="left" | Boston
| 10 || 0 || 8.1 || .393 || .375 || .900 || 1.0 || 1.2 || 0.1 || 0.1 || 3.4
|-
| align="left" | 1987–88
| align="left" | Milwaukee
| 14 || 2 || 10.4 || .317 || .333 || .571 || 1.4 || 2.1 || 0.3 || 0.1 || 2.3
|-
| align="left" | 1987–88
| align="left" | Sacramento
| 15 || 0 || 13.8 || .469 || .484 || .867 || 1.3 || 1.7 || 0.5 || 0.2 || 7.8
|- class="sortbottom"
| style="text-align:center;" colspan="2"| Career
| 93 || 2 || 8.1 || .378 || .379 || .757 || 0.9 || 1.1 || 0.2 || 0.1 || 3.3
|}

Playoffs

|-
| align="left" | 1986–87
| align="left" | Boston
| 11 || 0 || 3.2 || .500 || .200 || .500 || 0.5 || 0.0 || 0.0 || 0.0 || 2.0
|}

Coaching career
After retiring, he became an assistant coach with Division III's Claremont McKenna College (where his father worked as a college professor) in his hometown of Claremont, California. He also served as associate director of the career services center, assisting students to gain employment. He remained there for five years until 2006 when he was hired as an assistant coach for the Perth Wildcats of the Australian National Basketball League under head coach and former college teammate Scott Fisher.  After Fisher left the Wildcats, Henry became coach for the 2008–09 NBL season. In 2010, Conner joined the reformed Sydney Kings of the NBL as an assistant coach with Ian Robilliard.

He later became an assistant for the Los Angeles D-Fenders of the NBA Development League. In October 2013, he was named the head coach of the NBA D-League's Fort Wayne Mad Ants for the 2013–14 season. On April 17, 2014, he was named the winner of the 2014 Dennis Johnson Coach of the Year award. On June 10, 2015, he stepped down as the Mad Ants' head coach and was named the Los Angeles D-Fenders head coach. However, he gave up the position to become, on June 26, assistant coach of the Orlando Magic. Henry worked as a scout for the Minnesota Timberwolves during games at the Staples Center from 2017 to 2019.

On April 22, 2020, he signed a three-year deal to become the head coach of the Adelaide 36ers of the NBL. On August 26, 2021, the 36ers released Henry from his contract.

Head coaching record

NBA D-League

|-
| style="text-align:left;"|Fort Wayne
| style="text-align:left;"|2013–14
| 50||34||16|||| style="text-align:center;"|1st in Eastern||6||6||0|||| style="text-align:center;"|Won NBA D-League Championship
|-
| style="text-align:left;"|Fort Wayne
| style="text-align:left;"|2014–15
| 50||28||22|||| style="text-align:center;"|2nd in Central||6||4||2|||| style="text-align:center;"|Lost in NBA D-League Finals
|- class="sortbottom"
! align="center" colspan=2|Career
! 100||62||38|||| ||12||10||2||||

References

External links

 Conner Henry @ acb.com 
 Connery Henry @ eurobasket.com
 Conner Henry @ fibaeurope.com
 Connery Henry @ proballers.com

1963 births
Living people
Adelaide 36ers coaches
American expatriate basketball people in Australia
American expatriate basketball people in France
American expatriate basketball people in Greece
American expatriate basketball people in Italy
American expatriate basketball people in Spain
American men's basketball coaches
American men's basketball players
Bakersfield Jammers players
Basketball coaches from California
Basketball players from California
BC Andorra players
Expatriate basketball people in Andorra
American expatriate basketball people in Andorra
Boston Celtics players
Fort Wayne Mad Ants coaches
Houston Rockets draft picks
Houston Rockets players
Liga ACB players
Miami Heat expansion draft picks
Milwaukee Bucks players
Minnesota Timberwolves scouts
National Basketball League (Australia) coaches
Orlando Magic assistant coaches
People from Claremont, California
Peristeri B.C. players
Rapid City Thrillers players
Sacramento Kings players
Shooting guards
Sporting basketball players
Sportspeople from Los Angeles County, California
UC Santa Barbara Gauchos men's basketball players
Valencia Basket players
Yakima Sun Kings players